Andrew Farai Rinomhota (born 21 April 1997) is an English-Zimbabwean professional footballer who plays as a midfielder for EFL Championship club Cardiff City.

Club career
Rinomhota was born in Leeds, West Yorkshire, Zimbabwean father, Welsh mother, and started his career in the youth team of AFC Portchester before he was promoted to the first team in the Wessex League due to an injury crisis. After impressing for the first team, scoring ten goals in 30 league games, manager Graham Rix contacted Reading to send a scout to watch Rinomhota in action, which subsequently resulted in a two-week trial. In April 2015, he signed for EFL Championship side Reading on an initial two-year contract with the option of a further twelve-month extension. He spent the majority of his first season with the club with under-18 and under-21 sides, moving up to the under-23 side in the 2016–17 season to play for the side in the EFL Trophy, amassing a total of thirty-nine appearances in all competitions. He was promoted to the first team in the summer of 2017 and joined the side on the pre-season tour of the Netherlands. In August 2017, he made his professional debut in the 2–0 EFL Cup win over Gillingham, playing the full ninety minutes. On 8 December 2017, Rinomhota signed a new contract with Reading until the summer of 2021. On 25 February 2019, Rinomhota signed a new three-year contract with Reading, lasting until the summer of 2022. Rinomhota scored his first goal for Reading against top of the table Norwich City on 10 April 2019 in the last minute of added time (90+7') in a 2–2 draw at Carrow Road. After an exceptional debut season, Rinomhota was awarded the 2018–19 player of the season.

On 24 June 2022, it was announced that Rinomhota would join Cardiff on a three-year deal from 1 July 2022.

International career
In December 2017, Zimbabwe explored the option of convincing Rinomhota to represent them at international level, which he is qualified to play for through his father. In May 2018, Rinomhota was named in Zimbabwe's provisional squad for the 2018 COSAFA Cup. However, Zimbabwe faced difficulties in getting Rinomhota into their squad, as Zimbabwean law required him to renounce his British citizenship in order to get a local passport.

Career statistics

References

External links

1997 births
Living people
English footballers
English people of Zimbabwean descent
Footballers from Leeds
Association football midfielders
A.F.C. Portchester players
Reading F.C. players
Cardiff City F.C. players
Black British sportspeople
Wessex Football League players